Friendship is the fourth album by Dublin-based instrumental rock band The Redneck Manifesto. Released on 26 March 2010, it was the band's first full-length in six years, and their first record since signing to Richter Collective. To promote Friendship, tracks "Black Apple" and "Smile More" were available to download on Nialler9 and Thumped respectively.

Track listing

References

2010 albums